Vardun is a village in Targovishte Municipality, Targovishte Province, Bulgaria.

History 
Until the 1980s, Vardun had over 300 Bulgarian dwellings and several gypsies dwellings. It was separated from the village of Cherkovna. Later on urbanization processes incited movements toward the chief Bulgarian towns. Gradually, gypsies began to settle in Vardun. Nowadays, they form the majority of the population.

Vardun survived as a Bulgarian settlement (without other nationalities) during the several waves of prosecutions against Bulgarians. After the disastrous Tarnovo rebellions (1593 and 1680), Turks converted many villages in the region to Mohammedanism. Many people from Vardun were killed or banished.

Despite all these, Vardun survived. The Turkish Empire moved Muslim nomadic tribes from Asia to this region and tried to change its Bulgarian race. Thanks to their statute of "Voynugans" (also known as Войнуци), Vardunians had a privilege and advantage – they could possess land. During the Turk yoke, the land belonging to Vardunians was more than the land of all its neighbour Muslim villages. Muslims there were working as farm-hands on the Varduns' land.

In his History of Gabrovo as a settlement with a special martial statute, 12th to 19th centuries Boris Stanimirov pointed out how freedom-loving and confident Vardun Bulgarians were. Having such virtues, they managed to put fear on Deliorman and Gerlovo Turks, demonstrating superiority to them.

In an Ottoman tax register from the 16th century, some men from Vardun were recorded with their titles. One of them was logotur (logotet) Bahno. With regard to this is the interpretation of Stefan Chureshki in his publication "The list of Bulgarian princes", where he talks about a tzar’s inscription from 1281 found near Vardun. Two bolyars were mentioned there – Pagan (or Gagan after another reading) and Hinto - according to their rule over "the mountain" (it is supposed to be the near Preslavska mountain).

Geography 
Vardun is in the north part of Gerlovo area, a valley enclosed by the Balkans from the south, and by the Preslavska mountain from the northeast. Westward is the hilly Tozluk area and the Lisa mountain. Gerlovo was one of the most guarded regions in the medieval Bulgaria. In the Preslavska mountain alone (about 20 km distance), there had been remains of more than 10 strongholds.

Right next to Vardun, there were two strongholds: "Kaleto" (1,5 km from Vardun) and "Erpeka" (about 2,5 km from Vardun) – this was built on an upland and had at least two fortified belts. Between both strongholds is situated a place named Holuma which was settled and part of Vardun before the Turkish invasion.

There were several other strongholds near Vardun: the big stronghold "Gradishteto". It is within 5 km from Vardun before Prolaz. "Hisarlaka" was another stronghold near Paidushko village (within 7 km from Vardun). "Krumovo kale" stronghold (or "Misionis" as it is claimed after some recent investigations) – this is the only excavated stronghold in the region because it is within 8 km from the chief town of Targovishte (as far as it is from Vardun).

These three strongholds were keeping guard over the Boaza passage. Eastwards there were:  the big stronghold "Tepeto" (within 4 km from Vardun) near Cherkovna, "Chanakkale" stronghold (within 9 km from Vardun) near Tarnovca and "Kaleto" stronghold (within 6 km from Vardun) near Koprec. Other strongholds (poorly examined as well) in the Preslavska mountain were "Beloto gradishte" in the Dervishki passage, the strongholds near villages Ovcharovo, Dolna Kabda and others inside the mountain.

In Gerlov was so called Tsika (or Chika) (Τζίκας). A modern interpretation (based on unknown premises) claims that Tsika was the capital of the tribe of Severs. The chronicle of Theophanes Confessor from 9th century says that Tsika was the capital (if a settlement is meant) or the inner (metropolitan) region of the Bulgarian state where the palaces (αυλὴν) were.

Honours
Vardun Point on Graham Land, Antarctica is named after the village.

References

Villages in Targovishte Province